William Bedford Royall (April 15, 1825 – December 13, 1895) was a Union Army officer during the American Civil War and later a United States Army brigadier general. Born in Halifax, Virginia, he led a group of mounted volunteers from Missouri during the Mexican War. He became a first lieutenant of the United States Cavalry on March 3, 1855 and a captain on March 21, 1861. Despite his southern birth and his uncle Sterling Price's decision to join the Confederacy, Royall remained loyal to the Union and served in the Army of the Potomac. After the civil war, he served in Kansas under General George Crook. He retired on October 19, 1887 and died in Washington, D.C.

Further reading

References
 

1825 births
1895 deaths
Union Army officers
United States Army generals